Feed the Fire is a 1994 live album by the American jazz singer Betty Carter. The album was recorded at London's Royal Festival Hall during Carter's European tour. It was Carter's first live album since 1990's Droppin' Things, and her only album recorded outside of the United States.

Carter, who predominantly worked with young musicians at this stage of her career, was accompanied by an established trio of pianist Geri Allen, bassist Dave Holland and drummer Jack DeJohnette. The trio would reunite a year later with Carter for a performance at the San Francisco Jazz Festival, and after Carter's death, for Allen's 2004 album, The Life of a Song.

Feed the Fire peaked at 18 on the Billboard Top Jazz Albums chart.

The audio of the concert was recorded by the BBC, and amounted to 105 minutes. Carter only chose to release ten of the fourteen tunes performed, and the released concert amounted to less than an hour's worth of music.

Reception

In his review for AllMusic.com, Daniel Gioffre gave the album two-and-a-half stars out of five. Gioffre praised Carter's accompanists, describing Dave Holland's "...unerring sense of melody and pitch", Jack DeJohnette as "...nothing less than explosive, punctuating the solo statements of his bandmates with powerful flurries", and likened Geri Allen to fellow pianist Keith Jarrett, praising her solo on "Love Notes". Gioffre's wrote that Carter's "...vocal improvisations are on par with any instrumentalists," and described her "...dancing around the music with impeccable phrasing, dropping low into her register for punctuation" on "Lover Man" as "...heady, hypnotizing stuff." Gioffre reserved criticism for the length of some tracks and that the "...quality of the music itself tends to wander a bit."

New York magazine described the album as a "live state-of-jazz-vocals address" and Carter as "probably the most agile jazz singer alive."

Track listing
"Feed the Fire" (Geri Allen) – 11:20
"Love Notes" (Betty Carter, Mark Zubek) – 7:11
"Sometimes I'm Happy" (Irving Caesar, Clifford Grey, Vincent Youmans) – 3:33
"Lover Man (Oh Where Can You Be?)" (Jimmy Davis, Ram Ramirez, Jimmy Sherman) – 9:13
"I'm All Smiles" (Michael Leonard, Herbert Martin) – 5:26
"If I Should Lose You" (Ralph Rainger, Leo Robin) – 6:24
"All or Nothing at All" (Arthur Altman, Jack Lawrence) – 8:11
"What Is This Tune?" (Carter, Jack DeJohnette) – 7:20
"Day Dream" (Duke Ellington, John Latouche, Billy Strayhorn) – 12:08
"B's Blues" (Carter) – 2:21

Personnel 
Performance
 Betty Carter – vocals, executive producer
 Geri Allen – piano
 Dave Holland – double bass
 Jack DeJohnette – drums
Production
 Patricia Lie – art direction
 James Birtwhistle – engineer
 McDavid Hendersen – illustrations
 Rich Cook – liner notes
 Andrew Pothecary – photography
 Camille Tominaro – post production coordinator
 Richard Seidel – producer
 Ben Mundy – product manager

References

 

1994 live albums
Albums produced by Betty Carter
Albums recorded at the Royal Festival Hall
Betty Carter live albums
Verve Records live albums